A subhelic arc is a rare halo, formed by internal reflection through ice crystals, that curves upwards from the horizon and touches the tricker arc above the anthelic point. Subhelic arcs are a result of ray entrance and exit through prism end faces with two intermediate internal reflections.

Formation 
A subhelic arc is formed when sun rays enter one end face of an ice crystal in singly oriented columns and Parry columns, reflect off two of the crystals side faces, and exits the crystal through the opposite end face.  The ray leave the crystal in the exact opposite angle, resulting in a net deviation angle of 120°, the angle for the formation of 120° parhelia.  

The subhelic arc touches the top of the tricker arc, an indication the two have closely related ray paths.

The subhelic arc crosses the parhelic circle in an acute angle, and at a sun elevation of 27° it passes exactly through the 120° parhelion.

See also 
 Infralateral arc
 Wegener arc

Notes

References

External links 
  (Including a drawing from a halo observation in Oulunsalo, Finland, in April 1996.)
  (A halo display including a subhelic arc, observed in Oulu, Finland, May 2008.)

Atmospheric optical phenomena